"Hurricane (Cradle to the Grave)" is a song recorded by Grace Jones in 1997.

Background
The song was a collaboration with trip hop artist Tricky, intended for an album Force of Nature, planned to be released in 1998. Due to heavy disagreements between Jones and Tricky, the album was never completed, and only a scarce white label 12" single featuring two DJ Emily mixes by of the song was released. Jones later re-recorded the song as the title track of her first studio album release in 19 years, Hurricane, released October 2008.

"Hurricane" was used at the Issa Spring/Summer 2010 fashion show at London Fashion Week. Naomi Campbell was the opening model to the show who strutted to the line "I'll be a hurricane".

Track listing
12" single
A. "Cradle to the Grave" (The Hurricane Mix #1) – 9:56
B. "Cradle to the Grave" (The Hurricane Mix #2) – 7:54

References

1997 singles
Grace Jones songs
Songs written by Grace Jones
Trip hop songs
1997 songs